Grandy is an unincorporated community in Cambridge Township, Isanti County, Minnesota, United States.

Grandy is located north of the city of Cambridge at the junction of State Highway 65 (MN 65) and Isanti County Road 6.

Stanchfield and Braham are nearby.  ZIP codes 55029 (Grandy), 55008 (Cambridge), and 55080 (Stanchfield) all meet near Grandy.

A post office called Grandy has been in operation since 1899. Grandy was a station on the Great Northern Railroad.

Infrastructure

Transportation
  MN 65
  Isanti County Road 6

References

 Rand McNally Road Atlas – 2007 edition – Minnesota entry
 Official State of Minnesota Highway Map – 2013/2014 edition

Unincorporated communities in Minnesota
Unincorporated communities in Isanti County, Minnesota